The Vatican City, even though not a member of the European Union, became a member of the Eurozone. Since 2002 it has had a special agreement with the EU that allows this microstate to mint a limited number of euro coins. This article is specifically about the euro gold and silver (or other precious metals) commemorative coins of the Vatican City and does not cover the pre-euro commemorative coins.

2002 Coinage

2003 Coinage

2004 Coinage

2005 Coinage

2006 Coinage

2007 Coinage

2008 Coinage

Notes

References

 The €uro Coins Collection Network 

Vatican
Currencies of Vatican City